Mungo Jerry are a British rock band, formed by Ray Dorset in Ashford, Middlesex in 1970. Experiencing their greatest success in the early 1970s, with a changing lineup always fronted by Ray Dorset, the group's biggest hit was "In the Summertime". They had nine charting singles in the UK, including two number ones, five top 20 hits in South Africa, and four in the Top 100 in Canada.

History

Formation and original band: 1970–1971

Mungo Jerry came to prominence in 1970 after their performances at the Hollywood Festival at Newcastle-under-Lyme, Staffordshire, on 23–24 May, which was their first gig under this name, inspired by the poem "Mungojerrie and Rumpleteazer" from T. S. Eliot's Old Possum's Book of Practical Cats,  performing alongside Black Sabbath, Traffic, Ginger Baker's Air Force, the Grateful Dead (their first performance in the UK) and José Feliciano. Their 23 May show was well received and the organisers asked them to perform again on the following day. The band's first single, "In the Summertime", the first maxi single in the world, released on 22 May, entered the UK charts at No. 13 and the following week went straight to No. 1. Ray Dorset had to ask his boss for time off to do the BBC Show Top of the Pops.

Ray Dorset and Colin Earl had previously been members of The Good Earth. Bassist Dave Hutchins left to join Bobby Parker's band and the drummer was dismissed so Dorset and Earl decided to fulfil the one remaining gig, an Oxford University Christmas Ball in December 1968, as a three-piece with Joe Rush, one of Dorset's colleagues, on double bass. Also on the bill was Miller Anderson, making his debut as a singer and guitarist, and Mick Farren and the Social Deviants. Though booked for only one set, Good Earth were asked to perform another after the bands had finished, playing a selection of American folk/blues/skiffle/jug band music from Lead Belly, Woody Guthrie and others, and some of Dorset's songs.

The trio played more gigs and landed a regular slot at the Master Robert Motel in Osterley, Middlesex, where they soon built up a following, including banjo, guitar and blues harp player Paul King who eventually joined the band, making it a four-piece.

After Rush left, Mike Cole was recruited on double bass, and this line-up recorded the first seventeen Mungo Jerry tracks which made up the first album and maxi-single including "In the Summertime". When they made their national debut at the Hollywood Festival, Rush joined them on stage for some numbers to play washboard. The record topped the UK Singles Chart for seven weeks, made No. 1 in 26 countries around the world and to date has sold around 30 million copies.

According to Joseph Murrell's The Book of Golden Discs (1978), "Mungomania" was possibly the most startling and unpredictable pop phenomenon to hit Britain since The Beatles.

Mungo Jerry made their first trip to the United States in September 1970. On their return Mike Cole was fired and replaced by John Godfrey, who played bass on their second UK maxi-single, "Baby Jump", which also topped the UK chart in March 1971. The third UK single, another maxi, "Lady Rose", also released in 1971, was set to become another No. 1 hit, but it was temporarily withdrawn from sale on the order of the Public Prosecutor's Office. This was due to complaints about the inclusion of the traditional song "Have A Whiff on Me" (to which Dorset had added some of his own lyrics) on the grounds that it advocated the use of cocaine. The maxi single was then reissued with “She Rowed” in place of the offending song.

Dorset was the composer, guitarist, blues harp, kazoo player, frontman and singer. On return from a long tour of the Far East at the beginning of 1972 he was summoned to the band's management office and told by two of the other band members that he was fired and that his place was being taken by Dave Lambert.

Line-up changes and side-projects: 1972–1980s

With time, Dorset found the group's good-time blues and jug band repertoire a little restricting, and in 1972 he released a solo album Cold Blue Excursion, with his songs backed by strings and brass and, in one instance, a jazz band. His intention to broaden the group's appeal by recruiting a drummer led to King and Earl trying to sack him, but the management, regarding Dorset as inseparable in the public eye from Mungo Jerry, fired them both instead. Dorset and Godfrey, the bassist, recruited new members and presented a new sound, heard on the fourth album Boot Power. Colin Earl and Paul King went on to form The King Earl Boogie Band and recorded an album at Richard Branson's Manor Studios called Trouble at Mill, produced by Dave Cousins of Strawbs. They played together on and off in the years following and ended up with a band called Skeleton Crew.

Mungo Jerry's hits continued through to 1976 with "Open Up" (Top Twenty in Europe); "Alright, Alright, Alright" (a rewrite of an old French hit for Jacques Dutronc, and again a major hit worldwide reaching the Top 3 in the UK); "Wild Love"; "Long Legged Woman Dressed in Black", "Hello Nadine" (European hit and Top Five in Canada), and "It's a Secret" (European hit)".You Don't Have to Be in the Army to Fight in the War" gave Mungo Jerry another hit.

In 1975, Earl returned to play keyboards, drummer Peter Sullivan joined and percussion player Joe Rush, part-time member of the band in earlier days, also came back for a while. The group's line-up continued to change. Among those who have played with them are bassist Bob Daisley, drummers Dave Bidwell, Paul Hancox and Boris Williams, guitarist Dick Middleton, keyboard player Sev Lewkowicz, and keyboard/accordion player Steve Jones. They have remained popular throughout Europe. Mungo Jerry was the first western band to have live television gigs in all countries behind the Iron Curtain.

In 1980 another Dorset song, "Feels Like I'm in Love", originally written for Elvis Presley, and recorded by the band as a B side of a single, became a British number one hit for Kelly Marie. They remained successful with overseas hits like "On A Night Like This", "Knockin' on Heaven's Door" (a reggae version of the Bob Dylan song) and "Sunshine Reggae" (British version by Mungo Jerry & Horizon).

In 1983, Dorset was part of the blues super-group Katmandu, which recorded A Case for the Blues, with guitarist Peter Green, formerly of Fleetwood Mac, and keyboard player Vincent Crane, formerly of Atomic Rooster and The Crazy World of Arthur Brown.

Members
Current members
 Ray Dorset – vocals, guitars (only everstanding member)

Former members

 Colin Earl – piano (original member)
 Paul King – banjo, jug (original member)
 Mike Cole – bass (original member)
 John Godfrey – bass (1945–2014)
 Joe Rush – percussion (1940–2020)
 Bob Daisley – bass
 Byron Contostavlos – bass (died 2007)
 Paul Raymond – keyboards, guitars (died 2019)
 Boris Williams – drums
 Dave Bidwell – drums (died 1977)
 Dick Middleton – guitars
 Eric Dillon – drums
 Ian Milne – piano
 Paul Hancox – drums
 Sev Lewkowicz – keyboards
 Jamei Roberts - drums 
 Tim Green – guitars, harmonica
 Chris Warnes - bass
 Jon Pope – keyboards
 Peter Sullivan - drums
 Tim Reeves – drums
 John Cook – piano and clavinet
 John Brunning – guitar

Discography

 Mungo Jerry (1970)
 Electronically Tested/Baby Jump (1971)
 You Don't Have to Be in the Army (1971)
 Boot Power (1972)
 Long Legged Woman (1974)
 Impala Saga (1976)
 Lovin' in the Alleys, Fightin' in the Streets (1977)
 Ray Dorset & Mungo Jerry (1978)
 Together Again (1981)
 Boogie Up (1984)
 Snakebite (1991)
 Old Shoes New Jeans (1997)
 Candy Dreams (2001)
 Adults Only (2003)
 Naked from the Heart (2007)
 When She Comes She Runs All Over Me (2007)
 Cool Jesus (2011)
 Kicking Back (2015)
 Xstreme (2019)

See also 
 List of 1970s one-hit wonders in the United States

References

Further reading
 John Van der Kiste and Derek Wadeson: Beyond the Summertime: The Mungo Jerry Story (A & F, 1990)

External links 

 
 
 

1969 establishments in England
Dawn Records artists
Jug bands
Musical groups established in 1969
Pye Records artists